Huck Out West is a 2017 novel by American author Robert Coover. The novel concerns the lives of Tom Sawyer and Huckleberry Finn during and after the American Civil War. The novel is one of several to imagine Huck's life after The Adventures of Huckleberry Finn.

References

2017 American novels
Sequel novels
Works based on Adventures of Huckleberry Finn
Novels set during the American Civil War
Western (genre) novels
W. W. Norton & Company books